CUF may refer to:

 Centre Party Youth, Centerpartiets Ungdomsförbund, the youth organization of the Center Party in Sweden
 Center for Union Facts, an advocacy group critical of unions
 Civic United Front, a political party in Tanzania
 Companhia União Fabril, a Portuguese company
 Grupo Desportivo Fabril do Barreiro, formerly the Grupo Desportivo da Companhia União Fabril, a Portuguese football (soccer) team
 CUF, Cincinnati, Ohio, a neighborhood in Cincinnati, Ohio
 The IATA airport code for Cuneo Levaldigi Airport, in Piedmont, Italy
 Cursor Forward (ANSI), an ANSI X3.64 escape sequence
 Care Under Fire